Bacon Lake is a lake located in British Columbia, Canada, located north of Upper Campbell Lake.
The name is thought to be for H.N. Bacon, who was "guide for the province's exploratory survey of Strathcona Park".

References

Lakes of Vancouver Island
Comox Land District